The 2022 Duel at the Dog 200 was a NASCAR Whelen Modified Tour race that was held on June 19, 2022. The race was originally schedule to be run on June 18, but was postponed due to rain. It was contested over 150 laps on the  oval. It was the 6th race of the 2022 NASCAR Whelen Modified Tour season. Justin Bonsignore collected his second victory of the season with a late-race pass for the lead.

Report

Entry list 

 (R) denotes rookie driver.
 (i) denotes driver who is ineligible for series driver points.

Practice

Qualifying

Starting lineup

Race 

Laps: 200

Race statistics 

 Lead changes: 4
 Cautions/Laps: 4 for 22 laps
 Time of race: 0:53:55
 Average speed: 55.641

References 

2022 NASCAR Whelen Modified Tour
2022 in sports in New Hampshire
Duel at the Dog 200